Limakesh (also Romanized as Līmākesh; also known as Lamākesh) is a village in Sakht Sar Rural District, in the Central District of Ramsar County, Mazandaran Province, Iran. At the 2006 census, its population was 86, in 17 families.

References 

Populated places in Ramsar County